Jarremix is an album remixing music by Jean-Michel Jarre. The album was released in 1995. It largely consists of remixes of the tracks "Chronologie 4" and "Chronologie 6" from Chronologie, the then latest studio album by Jarre and released two years prior. The release of Jarremix coincided with Jarre's "Concert pour la Tolérance".

About the title 
The title "Jarremix" is a pun of the two words "Jarre" and "Remix". The one reads JarreMix, the other reads JarRemix.

Track listing 

 "Chronologie 6 (Main Mix)" – 8:04 (By Gat Decor)
 "Chronologie 4 (E-Motion Mix)" – 5:59  (By Sunscreem)
 "Equinoxe 4" (Deep Mix) – 4:44  (By Bruno Mylonas & Thierry Leconte)
 "Chronologie 4 (S x S Mix)" – 6:36  (By Sunscreem)
 "Revolution, Revolutions (Oriental Mix)" – 6:46  (By Bruno Mylonas & Bruce Keen)
 "Equinoxe 7 (Ambiant Mix)" – 5:03  (By Bruno Mylonas & Bruce Keen)
 "Chronologie 4 (Tribal Trance Mix)" – 5:37  (By Black Girl Rock)
 "Oxygene 1 (Laboratoire Mix)" – 9:30  (By Laurent Garnier)
 "Magnetic Fields 2 (Magnetic Mix)" – 4:10  (By Bruno Mylonas & Thierry Leconte)
 "Chronologie 6 (Slam Mix 1)" – 8:06  (By Slam)
 "Calypso (Latino Mix)" – 7:13  (By Bruno Mylonas)

References

External links 
 Jarremix at Discogs
 Jarremix  at JarreUK

Jean-Michel Jarre albums
1995 remix albums
Electronic remix albums